Sigorus porcus, also called Mahogany Ridgeback scarab, is a species of scarab beetle in the family Scarabaeidae. It is found in the Palearctic. This species was formerly a member of the genus Aphodius.

References

Scarabaeidae
Beetles described in 1792
Beetles of Europe